Basudev Than (pronounced as [baxudew tʱan]) or Narua Satra is a satra located in Dhakuakhana, Lakhimpur, Assam. It was first established in the 14th century by the Chutia king Satyanarayan. Originally known as Laumura Satra, this satra is well known in Assam and other parts of India.

Etymology
Damodar Ata established this satra in the 17th century as Laumura Satra. However, the plot of the which was originally donated by Chutia king Satyanarayan was transferred to many people many times. This led to the name na-rua which might mean 'not stay'. The name Basudev Than is related to the Assamese word for lord Vishnu-- Baxudew.

Legends
According to the legend constructed in the 16th-century Rukmini Haran by Srimanta Sankardev, Rukmini made the statue of Basudev for her desire to marry him.

History

Although the original temple was built in 14th-15th century during the rule of Chutia kings Lakshminarayan and Satyanarayan, it was shifted to the present location in mid-17th century by the grandson of Sankardeva, Damodar Ata as Laumura Satra, during the rule of Ahom king Jayadhwaj Singha. There is controversy whether Damodar Ata came from Bijani or from Upper Assam.

The land of the Satra (where it was originally located) was donated by the Chutia king of Sadhayapur/Sadiya, Satyanarayan in 1392 A.D. to a Brahmin named Narayan Dwij for Bishnu Puja.
Later, a Brahmin family took the land and finally a member of the Brahmin family 'Bahude' gave the land to Damodar Ata in the 17th century. According to others, in 1401 A.D., Sadhayapuriya/Sadiya Chutia king Laxminarayan devoted the land to Ravidev Basaspati for Bishnu Puja. From this family, the land was eventually transferred to Damodar Ata for setting up the Satra in the 17th century. From then on, the temple and the satra merged and it was known as Narua Satra.

After Damodar Ata's death, Ramakanta Ata took the place of the Adhikar. However, having to look two other Satras a well, Basudev Than, due to neglection, almost turned into a forest. In 1683, Ramdev Ata took the place of the Adhikar, after the death of Ramakanta Ata. Here the land of the temple was granted to a priest named  Ravidas Vanaspati whose descendant Bahude finally gave the land to the Vaishnavite saint Damodardev Ata for setting up the Satra. From then on, the temple and the satra merged and it was known as Narua Satra. During this time, the temple was finally transferred to the present-day location. By that time, the Ahom kings started to pay respect to the Satradhikars. In 1707, Ahom king Gourinath Singha decided to visit this satra. However, he had to return from a place now called Uvata Sampara (Uvata meaning 'to return'). Knowing this, Satradhikar felt sorry, left this satra and went to live in Barpeta. Later on, when king came to know of this, he regretted and sent Mahidhar Dangariya there and bestowed a Bor-Kah.

Gradually, this place became deserted. This remained so till the arrival of Rangain Aldhara. Later on, Achyut Ata, with the help of Aldhara established a temple there. The Basudev Mandir was established in 'Maghi Purnima'. And thus, people organize Pal Nam every year on Maghi Purnima till date. His brother, Mahesh Ata built a big Namghar there. Over the years priest like Rupendra Dev Goswami, Bhupendra Dev Goswami have taken charge of the temple.

According to the copper plate inscriptions found in Dhenukhana, the  statues of the former temple included Basudev, Amba and Ganesha. During the days of Damodardev, another statue of Basudev carved out of black stone is said to be transferred from Kundil in Sadiya which was the capital of Chutia kingdom. According to the manuscript Thakur Charita, a statue carved out of black stone was transferred from Sadiya during the rule of the Ahom king Jayadhwaj Singha and established in the Noruwa Satra. The statue is about 4 feet in length. This indicates that the Satra and the temple merged during the 17th century to form the Basudev Narua Satra. The other statues and artifacts found in the temple dates back to 1392 when it was established by the Chutia kings.

Access
The Lakhimpur railway station is the nearest railway station, and Lilabari Airport is the nearest airport. It is 10 km away from Dhakuakhana town.

Notes

References

Satras (Ekasarana Dharma)